149th meridian may refer to:

149th  meridian east, a line of longitude east of the Greenwich Meridian
149th meridian west, a line of longitude west of the Greenwich Meridian